Carmel may refer to:

 Carmel (biblical settlement), an ancient Israelite town in Judea
 Mount Carmel, a coastal mountain range in Israel overlooking the Mediterranean Sea
 Carmelites, a Roman Catholic mendicant religious order

Carmel may also refer to:

Arts, entertainment, and media
 Carmel (band)
 Carmel (2011 film), a drama film starring Josh Hutcherson and Hayden Panettiere
 Carmel: Who Killed Maria Marta?, a 2020 Argentinian true crime documentary miniseries directed by Alejandro Hartmann

Businesses
 Carmel Agrexco, an Israeli exporter of agricultural produce
 Carmel Ventures, an Israeli venture capital firm
 Carmel Winery, an Israeli vineyard and winery
 Autocars Co. or Carmel automobile, an Israeli manufacturer of fiberglass-shelled cars

Places

Australia
 Carmel, Western Australia, a suburb of Perth, Western Australia

Israel and Near East
 Carmel, Har Hebron, an Israeli settlement in the West Bank
 Carmel City, a Druze town in Haifa, Israel
 Carmel Market, a shuq in Tel Aviv, Israel
 al-Karmil, a Palestinian village and modern-day successor to the biblical Carmel in Judea
 French Carmel, a neighborhood in Haifa, Israel

Spain
 El Carmel, a district in Barcelona, Catalonia

Philippines
 Carmel Mall, in Canlubang, Laguna

United States

 Carmel-by-the-Sea, California, or "Carmel"
 Carmel Highlands, California
 Carmel Mission (Mission San Carlos Borromeo de Carmelo), a Spanish mission located in Monterey County, California
 Carmel River (California), a river in Monterey County, California
 Carmel Valley (disambiguation)
 Carmel Valley Village, California
 Carmel Valley, San Diego, California
 Carmel, Indiana
 Carmel, Maine
 Carmel, New York
 Carmel (hamlet), New York
 Carmel, Ohio
 Carmel Formation, a rock unit in Utah
 Carmel, West Virginia
 Carmel, Wisconsin

Wales
 Carmel, Anglesey
 Carmel, Carmarthenshire
 Carmel, Flintshire
 Carmel, Gwynedd
 Carmel Chapel, Penrhiwceiber, Rhondda Cynon Taf
 Carmel Chapel, Trecynon, Rhondda Cynon Taf

People

 Carmel Bakurski (born 1976), Australian field hockey defender
 Carmel Kaine (1937–2013), Australian classical violinist
 Carmel Kallemaa (born 1997), Canadian rhythmic gymnast
 Carmel McCourt (born 1958), English singer
 Carmel Myers (1899–1980), American actress
 Carmel Robichaud, politician and retired teacher in New Brunswick, Canada
 Carmel Sepuloni (born 1977), New Zealand politician
 Eddie Carmel (1936–1972), Israeli-born entertainer, popularly known as "The Jewish Giant"
 John Carmel Heenan (1905–1975), English prelate of the Roman Catholic Church
 Roger C. Carmel (1932–1986), American character actor
 Roberta Karmel (born 1937), American attorney, law professor, and commissioner of the U.S. Securities and Exchange Commission

Other uses
 Carmel & District Cricket Club, a North Wales village cricket team at Flintshire
 Carmel daisy, a flowering plant of the family Dipsacales
 Carmel Formation, a Middle Jurassic rock unit in the southwestern United States
 i840 'Carmel', a 1999 chipset for Pentium processors
 Nvidia Carmel, a 2018 CPU macro design from Nvidia
 KARMEL, a mnemonic for causes of high anion gap metabolic acidosis
 Carmel Kazemi, a fictional character from the British soap opera EastEnders
 Storm Carmel, a 2021 storm that affected Cyprus and Israel

See also
 Carmel School (disambiguation)
 Mount Carmel (disambiguation), places named after Mount Carmel, Israel
 
 Caramel, a confection
 Carmeleno (disambiguation)
 Carmen (given name), a diminutive nickname for Carmel
 Karmiel